Yosef Shalom Elyashiv (10 April 1910 – 18 July 2012) was a Haredi Rabbi and posek (arbiter of Jewish law) who lived in Jerusalem. Until his death at the age of 102, Rav Elyashiv was the paramount leader of both Israel and the Diaspora Lithuanian-Haredi community, and many Ashkenazi Jews regarded him as the posek ha-dor, the contemporary leading authority on halakha, or Jewish law.

He spent most of his days engaged in Talmudical study, and delivered lectures in Talmud and Shulkhan Arukh at a local synagogue in the Meah Shearim area in Jerusalem where he lived. He received supplicants from all over the world, and answered the most complex Halakhic inquiries.

Biography
Rav Elyashiv was the son of Rav Avraham Elyashiv (Erener) of Gomel, Belarus, and Chaya Musha, daughter of the kabbalist Rav Shlomo Elyashiv (died 1925) of Šiauliai, Lithuania.

Born in 1910 at Šiauliai, Yosef Shalom Elyashiv arrived with his parents in Mandatory Palestine in 1922, aged 12. He was an only child, born to his parents after 17 years of marriage.

At the suggestion of the Chief Rabbi of Palestine, Rav Abraham Isaac Kook, Yosef Shalom married Sheina Chaya (died 19 June 1994), a daughter of Rav Aryeh Levin. Kook also conducted the wedding.

The couple had five sons and seven daughters. Six of their daughters married significant Rabbinic figures. During Elyashiv's lifetime, six of his children died. Two died in their youth: a son who died of illness as a child, and a daughter killed by Jordanian shelling in 1948. Four other children died over the course of his lifetime. At the time of his death, he had approximately 1,400 descendants, including two sixth-generation descendants. He had seen the beginning of a sixth generation in 2009, when a grandson was born to one of his great-grandchildren.

Death
In February 2012, the 101-year-old Rav was admitted into the cardiac intensive care unit of the Jesselson Heart Center at the Shaare Zedek Medical Center under the supervision of cardiology branch head Dan Tzivoni and his personal physician. He was admitted due to an acute condition of edema of the lungs and congestion in the heart. He died on 18 July 2012, aged 102, and was buried on Har HaMenuchot after a late-night funeral procession that attracted an estimated 250,000 people.

Spiritual and political leader
In contrast to his later positions vis a vis the State of Israel, Rav Elyashiv began his Rabbinic career as a judge in the government's religious court system, and was a protégé of Israel's Ashkenazi chief rabbi, Yitzhak HaLevi Herzog. In the early 1970s, he left the state court system.

In 1989, upon the establishment of the religious political party Degel HaTorah, its spiritual leader Rav Elazar Shach asked Rav Elyashiv to join in the public leadership, and he acceded to his request. He came to the major public gatherings of Degel HaTorah, currently part of the umbrella United Torah Judaism list in the Israeli Knesset (parliament), and shared in the task of rendering decisions. While Rav Elyashiv held no official title, neither as head of a congregation, yeshiva, or particular community, after the death of Rav Shach he took his position and held great influence over the policies of the party, which abided by all his rulings and instructions. Most rosh yeshivas ("yeshiva deans") associated with the Agudath Israel of America movement frequently sought out his opinions and followed his advice and guidelines concerning a wide array of policy and communal issues affecting the welfare of Orthodox Judaism. Time referred to Rav Elyashiv as the predecessor of Rav Aharon Leib Shteinman as Gadol Hador ("leader of the generation").

Yossi Elituv, editor of the influential ultra-Orthodox paper Mishpacha, remarked:
"Rav Elyashiv will be remembered as the ultimate assiduous yeshiva scholar of the 20th and early 21st centuries. He was not seen as a political leader or as the head of group or party. He was a man who made Torah study his entire life, and this will remain an inspiration."

In 2010, Rav Elyashiv published a letter criticizing the Shas Party for joining the World Zionist Organization (WZO). He wrote that the Party "is turning its back on the basics of Charedi Jewry of the past hundred years. In the words of Gedolei Yisroel: 'Zu Neveilah she’ein kamosa'." He compared this move to the decision of the Mizrachi movement to join the WZO [over one hundred years ago] which was the deciding factor in their separation from "authentic Torah Judaism."

Published works
The Halakhic rulings and sermonic insights of Rav Elyashiv have been recorded in several books. The 6 volume Kovetz Teshuvos Elyashiv contains responsa resulting from questions asked of him over many years. Many of his ethical and sermonic comments on the Torah, most dating from the 1950s, were collected and published as Divrei Aggadah. A Haggadah for Pesach including his comments and Halachic rulings was recently printed. Another work that includes his Halakhic rulings is titled "Yashiv Moshe".

His Talmudic insights were printed in the 18 volume series of Haoros and more recently Shiurei Maran Hagrish Elyashiv on Tractate Berachot and the following books: "Pniney Tefila"' "Pniney Chanuka" and "Pniney Nisuin". These works were not written by Rav Elyashiv, but compiled by his relatives and students; the "Pniney" series was published by Rabbi Bentzion Kook.

See also
Nachum Eisenstein

References

Further reading
 Schapiro, Moshe. "Halachic Ruling Redefines Role of Kiruv Work in Eretz Yisroel". Dei'ah veDibur, April 21, 1999.
 Eliashiv, Yosef Shalom. "Letter from HaRav Eliashiv". Dei'ah veDibur, June 2, 2002.
 Avraham(Rami) Reiner. "R’ Yosef Shalom Elyashiv as a halachic decisor". Modern Judaism 33

External links

 Picture of Rav Elyashiv deep in conversation with Grand Rav Mayer Alter HaLevi Horowitz, the Bostoner Rebbe Shlita
 Video footage of Chassidic Rebbes meeting with Rav Elyashiv
 Who was Rabbi Yosef Shalom Elyashiv? -Aish.com biography
 Lectures by Rav Eliashiv on various topics (in Hebrew and Yiddish)
 List of Rav Elyashiv's printed works
 "Rav Yosef Shalom Elyashiv, a giant among the ultra-Orthodox" Haaretz, 19 July 2012
 "Times of Israel" obituary
 Rav Elyashiv’s Rulings By Rav Yair Hoffman
 More of Rav Elyashiv’s Rulings By Rav Yair Hoffman

1910 births
2012 deaths
People from Šiauliai
People from Shavelsky Uyezd
Lithuanian Jews
Lithuanian emigrants to Mandatory Palestine
Ashkenazi Jews in Mandatory Palestine
Israeli Orthodox Jews
Haredi rabbis in Israel
20th-century rabbis in Jerusalem
21st-century rabbis in Jerusalem
Israeli centenarians
Rabbis in Jerusalem
Exponents of Jewish law
Authors of books on Jewish law
Burials at Har HaMenuchot
Men centenarians